A by-election was held for the New South Wales Legislative Assembly seat of Cabramatta on 18 October 2008 to coincide with the Lakemba, Port Macquarie and Ryde by-elections.  The Cabramatta by-election was triggered by the resignation of sitting member and former Health Minister Reba Meagher, after a spectacular series of events that saw both the Deputy Premier and the Premier resign.

The seat was retained by the Labor Party at the by-election, but with a sharp decline in the party's vote.

Results

References

External links
 ABC District Profile & Election Coverage

2008 elections in Australia
New South Wales state by-elections
2000s in New South Wales